In computer science, a coprocess is a process that explicitly yields control to other processes or the operating system.

In Unix, a coprocess is a process that sends its output solely to the exact single process from which it solely received input.

Bash, BETA and ksh have language constructs for coprocesses.

See also 

 Deterministic concurrency

External links 

 Coprocesses definition in Bash Reference Manual

Process (computing)
Concurrent computing